Aaron Francis (born 10 August 1997) is a professional Australian rules footballer playing for the Sydney Swans in the Australian Football League (AFL), after initially being drafted by the Essendon Football Club with their second selection and sixth overall in the 2015 national draft. In October 2022, he was traded to the Sydney Swans.

Early life
Francis was considered to be the best utility in his draft group, showing talent for South Australia, dominating games from both ends of the ground. He was named at centre half-forward in the All-Australian team during the 2015 AFL Under 18 Championships, often compared to AFL players Luke Hodge and Brendon Goddard in his junior year.

Playing career
Francis is the third of four boys, his older brother Hayden, who was a Brisbane supporter, died from cancer in 2014. After the match he said "It was a big day for the family, the way everything came together and they were very proud of me.’’

Due to personal struggles, coupled with failing to find opportunity in Essendon's best 22, during the 2017 AFL Trade Period, the difficult start to his AFL career culminated in Aaron requesting a trade away from the club he supported as a child, to move back to South Australia. However, as little interest was shown by both the recent Grand Final Runners Up, Adelaide Football Club, or the Port Adelaide Football Club, Essendon chose not to release Aaron from his contract, which was due to expire at the conclusion of the 2019 AFL season because they still saw the untapped potential which swayed them to draft Aaron with pick 6 in the 2015 national draft and fully backed him to improve.

Surprisingly, Aaron spent this time mainly in Melbourne - including a stint coaching a local junior Basketball team - all while the club and his teammates stayed in contact.

After some strong performances in the VFL and toward the end of the AFL season, Aaron was selected to return to the senior team against Sydney in Round 19, with 5 games until the end of the 2018 Home and Away season and as Essendon's finals hopes faded. Aaron took this opportunity with both hands and delivered some moments of brilliance in the last 5 games of the season; including an eight mark effort against reigning premiers, Richmond Football Club, being named in Essendon's best, as well as soaring for a Mark of the Year contender against Port Adelaide in Round 23 over former  player, Paddy Ryder.  which to the AFL communities surprise, did not even receive a nomination in the lead up to the 2018 Brownlow Medal night, when Swan Isaac Heeney took out the award.

Statistics
Statistics are correct to the end of the 2020 season

|- style="background-color: #EAEAEA"
| 2016 ||  || 10 || 3 || 1 || 2 || 20 || 11 || 31 || 12 || 5 || 0.3 || 0.7 || 6.7 || 3.7 || 10.3 || 4.0 || 1.7  
|-
! scope="row" style="text-align:center" | 2017
|  || 10 || 2 || 1 || 3 || 10 || 12 || 22 || 7 || 3 || 0.5 || 1.5 || 5.0 || 6.0 || 11.0 || 3.5 || 1.5 
|- style="background-color: #EAEAEA"
! scope="row" style="text-align:center" | 2018
|  || 10 || 5 || 1 || 0 || 51 || 15 || 66 || 32 ||11 || 0.2 || 0 || 10.2 || 3 || 13.2 || 6.4 || 2.2  
|-
! scope="row" style="text-align:center" | 2019
|  || 10 || 17 || 3 || 3 || 129 || 96 || 225 || 80 || 30 || 0.2 || 0.2 || 7.6 || 5.7 || 13.2 || 4.7 || 1.8
|- style="background-color: #EAEAEA"
! scope="row" style="text-align:center" | 2020
|  || 10 || 8 || 0 || 0 || 44 || 35 || 79 || 27 || 14 || 0.0 || 0.0 || 5.5 || 4.4 || 9.9 || 3.4 || 1.8
|- class="sortbottom"
! colspan=3| Career
! 35
! 6
! 8
! 254
! 169
! 423
! 158
! 63
! 0.2
! 0.3
! 7.3
! 4.8
! 12.1
! 4.5
! 1.8
|}

References

External links

1997 births
Living people
Essendon Football Club players
West Adelaide Football Club players
Australian rules footballers from South Australia